Sport Club Gaúcho , also known as Gaúcho, is a Brazilian soccer club based in Passo Fundo, Brazil.

History
This club was founded on May 12, 1918 to serve the central plateau in the northern region of Rio Grande do Sul. Gaúcho won twice the lower divisions of the Campeonato Gaúcho (the Rio Grande do Sul state league), in 1966 and 1977.

In 1980s the club played in the first division of state league, but, lacking sponsorship, generally finished in the middle rankings.

In 2000, Gaúcho faced financial difficulties.  While the club had historically weathered such downsizings in the past, the 2000 difficulties resulted in the loss of access to their stadium. Lacking municipal support and facing mounting debts, the club folded in 2005. Responding to popular support, the club was revived in 2009.

Achievements

Campeonato Gaúcho
 Second Division championship 3 times: 1966, 1977 and 1984
 Second Division second place: 1965 and 2005
 Third Division championship: 2000
 Copa FGF second place: 2004
 Municipal Competition League championship 15 times: 1926, 1927, 1928, 1938, 1939, 1948, 1949, 1950, 1954, 1961, 1963, 1964, 1965, 1966 and 1967

Stadium
Gaúcho play their home games at Arena Wolmar Salton. The stadium has a maximum capacity of 8,000 people.

Rankings
 CBF
 Place: 360th
 Score: 1 point
 FGF
 Place: 20th
 Score: 360 points

Rivalry
Gaúcho's principal rivalry is with Esporte Clube Passo Fundo, against whom they play in the "Planalto Médio Derby".

References

Association football clubs established in 1918
Football clubs in Rio Grande do Sul
1918 establishments in Brazil